Earnest Collins Jr. is an American college football coach, most recently for the University of Northern Colorado, a position he held from 2011 to 2019.  Collins also served as the head football coach at Alcorn State University for the 2009 and 2010 seasons. On April 6, 2021, Collins was announced as the head coach for Gateway High School.

Head coaching record

References

External links
 Northern Colorado profile

Year of birth missing (living people)
Living people
American football defensive backs
Alcorn State Braves football coaches
Kansas Jayhawks football coaches
Northern Colorado Bears football coaches
Northern Colorado Bears football players
Northwest Missouri State Bearcats football coaches
UCF Knights football coaches
African-American coaches of American football
African-American players of American football
20th-century African-American sportspeople
21st-century African-American sportspeople